Dario Bellezza (5 September 1944 – 31 March 1996) was an Italian poet, author and playwright. He won the Viareggio, Gatto, and Montale prizes.

Biography
Dario Bellezza was born in Rome on 5 September 1944. After his studies at a liceo classico in his native city, from which he graduated in 1962, he worked for several Italian literary and poetry magazines: Paragone, Carte segrete, Bimestre, Periferia, and Il Policordo.

Bellezza entered the Roman intellectual world in the mid-1960s when, thanks to literary critic and writer Enzo Siciliano, he became increasingly close to Sandro Penna, Aldo Palazzeschi, Attilio Bertolucci, Alberto Moravia, and Elsa Morante, who eventually became a confidant.

The decade from 1950-1960 was a period in which the working class, the Italian Communist Party, the trade unions, and all their hopes for radical cultural change were dramatically defeated. The political and economic growth of the Christian Democrat middle class and the new, changed Freemasonries prevailed.

Bellezza, thus, lived in a political-cultural era convulsed by the ideological confrontations of the 1960s and the subversive ideological line of the aggressive neoavant-garde that struggled against conventional linguistic codes.

From the early 1960s on, Bellezza collaborated with the magazine Nuovi argomenti, becoming associate director shortly before his death.

When Invettive e licenze (Invectives and Licenses) appeared in 1971, it was hailed by Pier Paolo Pasolini in his introduction: "Here is the best poet of the new generation".
Invettive e licenze, notable for its technical rigor, depicts people overwhelmed by bitterness, shame, feelings of guilt, alienation, scandal, and sexual perversions. The poems also express a constant, thinly veiled desire for death.

Since 1978 has begun a productive collaboration with Pellicanolibri, with the series "Inediti rari e diversi", publishing texts by Alberto Moravia, Renzo Paris, Gianfranco Rossi, Goliarda Sapienza and Anna Maria Ortese, for her with Beppe Costa and Adele Cambria he will manage to enforce for the first time the Bacchelli’s law, an annuity which is intended to poets and writers in need.

Bellezza was a bourgeois, as were many other intellectuals, but differed from them, according to Pasolini, in being "the first poet bourgeois to judge himself".Pasolini had a profound affection for Bellezza's work and his artistic experience. The young poet reciprocated this feeling, and also was deeply grateful to Elsa Morante for what he called his poetic apprenticeship.

In 1981, enraged by the publication of the "obscene" photographs of the dead Pasolini "in tutta la loro gelida, disarmante crudezza... nudo, esposto, con tutte le macabre ferite esibite del suo 'sacro' martirio" (in their icy, disarming rawness... naked, exposed, with all the grisly wounds exhibited of his 'sacred' martyrdom), Bellezza wrote the biographical essay Morte di Pasolini (Death of Pasolini).

In 1983, he published io (me), the lack of capital letters intentional. In this work, Bellezza lightly but concretely describes his everyday life and the mediocre desperation of his loves in ample detail. The poet associates life with insomnia, a curse that constantly pursues him: 

In the book, he describes suffering from insomnia because, as a highly educated bourgeois and homosexual bigot, he feels tortured by a feeling of guilt and driven by the many contradictions that struggle against each other. Such contradictions are the quintessence of his existence:

In his guilt-ridden insomniac persona, he anticipated the poetry that would be too often adopted in the 1980s, that of the artist-outcast.

Bellezza was consumed by anguish and by the relics of (a now mocking) sense of hope: 

He is reduced to corrosive accounts of his own social condition:

The difficulty of homosexual life in Rome, particularly the requirements of secrecy and clandestinity of the love act, is a staple of Bellezza's poetic and prosaic writing. In Bellezza's first novel, L'innocenza (Innocence, 1971), Nino, the protagonist, consciously chooses the perdition and corruption of a living homosexual hell. In Bellezza's infernal world, homosexuality can be nothing else but prostitution and neurotically masochistic obsessions: in Lettere da Sodoma (Letters from Sodom, 1972), his conclusion is that everything is Hell and that the only salvation is the systematic refusal of the self.

Bellezza won the Viareggio prize in 1976 for Morte segreta, the Gatto prize in 1991 for Invettive e licenze, the Montale prize in 1994 for L'avversario, and for the play Ordalia della croce he received the Fondi la Postora prize in 1994.

He died of AIDS in Rome on 31 March 1996. That year, a poetry prize was established in his name.

Works

Poetry
 Invettive e licenze ("Invectives and licenses", 1971)
 Morte segreta ("Secret death", 1976)
 Libro d'amore ("Book of love", 1982)
 io (me) ("I (me)", 1983)
 Piccolo canzoniere (small collection of lyrics, 1986)
 Undici erotiche ("Eleven erotic pieces", 1986)
 Serpenta (Lo specchio) (1987) .
 Libro di poesia ("Book of poetry", 1990) .
 Testamento di sangue ("Testament of blood", 1992) .
 Gatti e altro ("Cats etc.", 1993)
 L'avversario ("The adversary", 1994) .
 Proclama sul fascino ("Manifest of glamour", 1996) .

The collected works were published as:
 Poesie 1971-1996 (2002)

His poems have appeared in English translations:
 by Ruth Feldman and Brian Swann in Italian Poetry Today: Currents and Trends
 by Luca Baldoni in Italian Poetry Review, vol 1, 2006 pp. 76–91 
 by Peter Covino in Asymptote

Prose
 L'innocenza ("Innocence", 1970) ., Pellicanolibri, 1992
 Lettere da Sodoma ("Letters from Sodom", 1972)
 Il carnefice ("The executioner", 1973)
 Angelo ("Angel", 1979)
 Morte di Pasolini ("Pasolini's death", 1981, also published as Il poeta assassinato: Una riflessione, un'ipotesi, una sfida sulla morte di Pier Paolo Pasolini (Gli specchi della memoria), 1996) .
 Storia di Nino De Donato ("The History of Nino", a new edition of L'innocenza) 1983.
 Turbamento ("Disturbance", 1984)
 L'amore felice: Romanzo ("Happy love: a novel", 1986) .
 L'innocenza e altri racconti, Pellicanolibri, 1992. 
 Nozze col diavolo: Romanzi e racconti ("Marriage with the devil", 1995) .

Theatre
 Testamento di sangue ("Testament of blood", 1992)
 Apologia di teatro - Colosseo ("Apology of theatre", 1983, Pellicanolibri, 1985
 Salomé (1991, Arduino Sacco, 2009)
 Morte funesta ("Woeful death", 1993)
 Ordalia della croce ("Ordeal of the cross", 1994)

Bibliography

English
Renzo Paris in Bloody Europe! Racconti, Playground, Rome, 2004.
Canadian Journal of Italian Studies, vol. 20, 1997. DeSoto Press.

Italian
Battisti, S. and M. Bettarini. Chi è il poeta?. Milan: Gammalibri, 1980.
Cavallaro, F. (ed.). L'arcano fascino dell'amore tradito, Giulio Perrone Editore, Roma 2006.
Cordelli, F. Il poeta postumo. Consenza: Lerici, 1978.
Cristallo, M. Uscir fuori Dieci anni di lotte omosessuali in Italia: 1971/1981, Teti, Milano 1996, pp. 36–38.
Cucchi, M. and S. Giovanardi. Poeti italiani del secondo novecento 1945-1995. Milan: Mondadori, 1996.
Esposito, V. L'altro Novecento nella poesia italiana: critica e testi. Bastogi, 1999.
Gnerre, F. L'eroe negato. Omosessualità e letteratura nel Novecento italiano, Baldini & Castoldi, Milano 2000.
Gregorini, M. Il male di Dario Bellezza: vita e morte di un poeta. Stampa alternativa/ Nuovi equilibri, 2006, 208 pages.
Gregorini, M. Morte di Bellezza: storia di una verità nascosta. Castelvecchi, 1997, 143 pages.
Priori, D. Diario di un mostro. Omaggio insolito a Dario Bellezza, 2006.

References

External links

Short biography and bibliography 

1944 births
1996 deaths
Writers from Rome
Italian male poets
Italian gay writers
Gay poets
Italian LGBT poets
Italian LGBT dramatists and playwrights
Italian LGBT rights activists
Infectious disease deaths in Lazio
Viareggio Prize winners
Gay dramatists and playwrights
AIDS-related deaths in Italy
20th-century Italian poets
20th-century Italian dramatists and playwrights
Italian male dramatists and playwrights
Burials in the Protestant Cemetery, Rome
20th-century Italian male writers
20th-century Italian LGBT people